Anđelko Runjić (1938—2015) was a Croatian politician, economist and diplomat who served as 14th Speaker of the Croatian Parliament from 1986 to 1990 and Ambassador of Croatia to Russia from 1990 to 1991.

Personal life 
He was born in 1938 in Perković, Croatia and died in September 15, 2015. He received Doctorate in Law from Faculty of Economics and Business, University of Zagreb. He also served as Professor of Economic History at Faculty of Economics and Business, University of Zagreb. At the time of his death, he was married and father of two children. He was the last ambassador of Yugoslavia in the Soviet Union.

References 

1938 births
2015 deaths
People from Šibenik-Knin County
University of Zagreb alumni
Ambassadors of Croatia to Russia
Speakers of the Croatian Parliament